Bumpin' is the first and only album by Dis-n-Dat, released October 11, 1994, on Epic Records.

The album was produced by CC Lemonhead and Jay Ski, best known for their work with the popular Miami bass groups 95 South, 69 Boyz, and Quad City DJ's. Bumpin''', however, failed to match the success of those groups, only making it to 53 on the R&B charts and 24 on the Heatseekers chart. Despite the album's failure, the single "Freak Me, Baby" peaked at #60 on the Billboard Hot 100, the duo's only single to chart. "Party" also found success on the R&B and hip hop charts and appeared on ESPN's Jock Jams, Volume 2''.

Track listing
"Party"- 4:51
"Whoot, Here It Is"- 4:09
"Do Dat Thang"- 4:29
"Freak Me, Baby"- 3:24
"Double D Bass"- :50
"Bumpin'"- 3:06
"Callin Cleotis"- :42
"Hotel, Motel"- 3:23
"Yeah, Just Hit Me"- 3:30
"Dis 'N' Dat"- 4:09

Charts

References

1994 debut albums
Epic Records albums
Hip hop albums by American artists